The Wedding is a 1944 Soviet comedy film directed by Isidor Annensky.

The film, created by the eponymous vaudeville of Anton Chekhov, the stories of  The Wedding with General, Before the wedding,  the novel in two parts of the Marriage of convenience skit Bride and papa  is a caustic satire on the mores of the middle class philistine pre-revolutionary Russia.

Plot 
The burgess Zhigalov family who have a marriageable daughter Dasha, learn to their horror that the official Aplombov (Erast Garin) who dined with them every day and established himself as a groom, is not going to marry her at all. With great difficulty Dasha's father manages to persuade the ambitious groom to propose. The groom agrees, putting the condition of compulsory attendance of the General at the wedding.

And then finally the wedding takes place. At the festive moment the chief guest has arrived—the General. A scandal erupts at the peak of merriment when it became clear that the General is not really General, but only the captain of the second rank (lieutenant colonel). The wedding is ruined.

Cast 
 Alexey Gribov as Evdokim  Zhigalov, father of the bride
 Faina Ranevskaya as Nastassja Timofeevna Zhigalova, mother of the bride
 Erast Garin as Epaminondas Maksimovic aplomb groom
 Zoya Fyodorova as Dasha, bride
 Nikolay Konovalov as Fedor Yakovlevich Revunov-Karaulov, the captain of the 2nd rank in retirement
 Mikhail Yanshin as Andrei Nyunin, the agent of the insurance company
 Sergey Martinson as Ivan Mikhailovich Yat, telegraph
 Vera Maretskaya as Anna Martynovna Zmeyukina, midwife
 Osip Abdulov  as Harlampi Spiridonovich Dymba, confectioner
 Lev Sverdlin as grinder
 Tatyana Pelttser as doctor's wife
 Irina Murzaeva as guest
 Mikhail Pugovkin as guest

See also 
 The Wedding (Chekhov play)

References

External links 

 

1944 films
Films based on works by Anton Chekhov
Kartuli Pilmi films
Mosfilm films
Soviet black-and-white films
Films about social class
Films about weddings
Films set in the Russian Empire
Films shot in Moscow
Soviet romantic comedy films
1944 romantic comedy films
Russian romantic comedy films
Russian black-and-white films
1940s Russian-language films